Cowlishaw is a surname. Notable people with the surname include: 

 Gillian Cowlishaw (born 1934), New Zealand-born anthropologist
 James Cowlishaw (1834–1929), Australia architect, businessman and politician
 Mary Lou Cowlishaw (1932–2010), American politician
 Mike Cowlishaw, computer scientist
 Tim Cowlishaw (born 1955), American sportswriter
 William Harrison Cowlishaw (1869–1957), British architect

See also
 Cole slaw (disambiguation)